Simon Tischer (born 24 April 1982) is a German volleyball player. He was born in Schwäbisch Gmünd.

Career

Clubs

  Maoam Mendig
 2004-2007  VfB Friedrichshafen
 2007-2009  Iraklis Thessaloniki V.C.
 2009-2011  Olympiacos S.C. 
 2010-2011  Ziraat Bankası Ankara 
 2011-2012  Dinamo Krasnodar 
 2012-2013  Jastrzębski Węgiel 
 2013-2014  ASUL Lyon Volley
 2014-2018  VfB Friedrichshafen

References 
 Profile (German)
 Profile at sports-reference.com

1982 births
Living people
German men's volleyball players
Olympiacos S.C. players
Volleyball players at the 2008 Summer Olympics
Volleyball players at the 2012 Summer Olympics
Olympic volleyball players of Germany
Ziraat Bankası volleyball players
Jastrzębski Węgiel players
Iraklis V.C. players
People from Schwäbisch Gmünd
Sportspeople from Stuttgart (region)